The Golden Chain of Naqshbandi Haqqani Sufi Order is a lineage of Sufi masters of the Naqshbandi 'Aliyyah branch.

Chain
 Prophet Muhammad (570/571 - 632 CE),
 Abu Bakr as-Siddiq (573 - 634 AD),
 Salman the Persian (568 - 656 AD),
 Qasim ibn Muhammad ibn Abi Bakr (655 - 725 AD),
 Jafar al-Sadiq (702 -765 AD), 
 Tayfur Bayazid Bastami (804 - 874 AD),
 Abu al-Hassan al-Kharaqani (963 - 1033 AD),
 Abu Ali Farmadi (1016 - 1084 AD), 
 Yusuf Hamadani (1048 - 1141 AD), 
 Abu'l-Abbas, al-Khidr,
 Abdul Khaliq Ghijduwani, 
 Arif Riwgari, 
 Mahmood Anjir Faghnawi, 
 Ali Ramitani, 
 Mohammad Baba As-Samasi, 
 Sayyid Amir Kulal, 
 Imam at-Tariqah Baha' al-Din Naqshband,
 Sayyid Alauddin Atar, 
 Yaqub al-Charkhi, 
 Khwaja Ahrar, 
 Muhammad Zahid Wakhshi, 
 Darwish Muhammad, 
 Muhammad Khwaja al-Amkanaki, 
 Khwaja Baqi Billah, 
 Mujaddid Alf ath-Thani Ahmad Sirhindi
 Muhammad Sayfuddin al-Faruqi al-Mujaddidi, 
 Sayyid Nur Muhammad al-Badawani, 
 Shaheed Mirza Mazhar Jan-e-Janaan, Shams-ud-Dīn Habīb Allāh, 
 Shah Abdullah ad-Dahlawi 
 Shaykh Khalid al-Baghdadi, 
 Shaykh Ismail Muhammad al-Shirwani, 
 Shaykh Khas Muhammad ash-Shirwani, 
 Shaykh Muhammad Effendi al-Yaraghi, 
 Sayyid Jamaluddin al-Kumuki al-Husayni, 
 Shaykh Abu Ahmad as-Sughuri, 
 Shaykh Abu Muhammad al-Madani, 
 Shaykh Sharafuddin al-Daghestani, 
 Shaykh Abdullah al-Fa'iz ad-Daghestani, 
 Mawlana Shaykh Nazim Al-Haqqani
 Mawlana Shaykh Mehmet Adil ar-Rabbani

See also
 Naqshbandi Tahiri Golden Chain

References

Naqshbandi order